Atsuto Tatara (多々良 敦斗, born June 23, 1987) is a Japanese football player who currently plays for FC Maruyasu Okazaki.

Career
On 17 January 2019, Tatara joined FC Maruyasu Okazaki.

Club statistics
Updated to 23 February 2019.

References

External links

Profile at Roasso Kumamoto

1987 births
Living people
Shizuoka Sangyo University alumni
Association football people from Shizuoka Prefecture
Japanese footballers
J1 League players
J2 League players
Japan Football League players
Matsumoto Yamaga FC players
Vegalta Sendai players
JEF United Chiba players
Roasso Kumamoto players
FC Maruyasu Okazaki players
Association football defenders